Kamghe Gaba (born 13 January 1984 in Friedberg (Hessen)) is a German sprinter who specialises in the 400 metres. He represents LG Eintracht Frankfurt.

As a teenager he competed in combined events, finishing fifth in the octathlon at the 2001 World Youth Championships in Debrecen.

In 2006 he ran in a personal best of 45.47 seconds as he became German champion for the first time.

He has a German mother and a Chadian father.

Achievements

Personal bests 
 200 metres – 20.88 s (2008)
 400 metres – 45.47 s (2006)

References 

 

1984 births
Living people
People from Friedberg, Hesse
Sportspeople from Darmstadt (region)
German male sprinters
German national athletics champions
Athletes (track and field) at the 2004 Summer Olympics
Athletes (track and field) at the 2008 Summer Olympics
Athletes (track and field) at the 2012 Summer Olympics
Olympic athletes of Germany
German people of Chadian descent
Eintracht Frankfurt athletes
European Athletics Championships medalists